The 1980 United States Senate election in Georgia was held on November 4, 1980. Incumbent Democratic U.S. Senator and former Governor of Georgia Herman Talmadge ran for reelection to a fifth term, but lost narrowly to Mack Mattingly, Chairman of the Georgia Republican Party.

Mattingly became the first ever Republican popularly elected to the Senate in Georgia, as well as the first Republican Senator from the state since Reconstruction. This race was part of a landslide national election for Republicans that would come to be known as the Reagan Revolution.

Democratic primary

Candidates

Declared
 John Francis Collins
 Dawson Mathis, U.S. Representative from Albany 
 Zell Miller, Lieutenant Governor
 J. B. Stoner, white supremacist and terrorist
 Herman Talmadge, incumbent Senator since 1957
 Norman Underwood, Judge of the Georgia Court of Appeals

Campaign
Talmadge's ethical issues made him uniquely vulnerable. Because Georgia was seen as a strongly Democratic state, five primary opponents declared their candidacies for the Democratic nomination. Strongest among these candidates was Lieutenant Governor Zell Miller. Miller launched his campaign with support from black voters, organized labor, and the liberal wing of the Georgia Democratic Party. He campaigned against Talmadge on the argument that Talmadge had "disgraced" Georgia. Miller also attacked Talmadge's history as a segregationist and boasted of support from black leaders including Atlanta mayor Maynard Jackson and State Senator Julian Bond.

In the six-man primary held August 5, Miller and Talmadge advanced to a run-off election. Talmadge won the run-off election with 58.6% of the vote.

Results

Republican primary

Candidates
 Mack Mattingly, businessman and Chairman of the Georgia Republican Party

Mattingly was unopposed for the Republican nomination.

General election

Results

See also 
 1980 United States Senate elections

References 

1980 Georgia (U.S. state) elections
Georgia
1980